Iván Molina and Martina Navratilova were the defending champions, but Navratilova did not compete this year. Molina teamed up with Renáta Tomanová and lost in quarterfinals to runners-up Jaime Fillol and Pam Teeguarden.

Thomaz Koch and Fiorella Bonicelli won the title by defeating Jaime Fillol and Pam Teeguarden 6–4, 7–6 in the final.

Seeds
Both seeds received a bye into the second round.

Draw

Finals

Top half

Bottom half

External links
 Official Results Archive (WTA)
1975 French Open – Doubles draws and results at the International Tennis Federation

Mixed Doubles
French Open by year – Mixed doubles
1975 Grand Prix (tennis)
French Open - Mixed Doubles
1975 in women's tennis